Janet Henry is a visual artist based in New York City.

Early life and education 

Henry was raised in East Harlem and then in Jamaica, Queens, where she currently lives.

Henry attended the School of Visual Arts and the Fashion Institute of Technology. She was a participant in the Harlem Youth Opportunities Unlimited program (HARYOU) where she met instructor Betty Blayton Taylor. In 1974, Henry was a recipient of a Rockefeller Fellowship in Museum Education at the Metropolitan Museum of Art.

Career and artistic contributions 
Janet Henry's artistic work spans multiple mediums: collage and text-based work, jewelry, and sculpture/installations using multimedia materials. Her work often comments on American culture, including white male patriarchy, by making use of toys, dolls, and miniatures in her art installations. In the 1980s, she was known for creating and photographing necklaces and bracelets that featured sequences of materials. The work that she has completed has been showcased in solo and group exhibitions over the years.

In partnership with filmmaker Linda Goode Bryant, Henry produced Black Currant, a magazine which highlighted the experimental work of artists who were showcased by Just Above Midtown Gallery (JAM). The magazine was later known as B Culture and featured early works of Greg Tate. In the 1970s, Henry also worked in the Education Department at the Studio Museum in Harlem, where she collaborated with artist Carrie Mae Weems.

Janet is a funder and educator contributing at the New York State Council on the Arts, Jamaica Center for Arts and Learning, Lower Eastside Girls Club, and currently works at the Brooklyn Heights Montessori School.

Activism 
Janet Henry was vocally opposed to the exhibition The Nigger Drawings by Donald Newman at Artists Space and refused to show her own work in that gallery because of this show title. The exhibition was widely protested for the racism of this exhibition name by artists including Carl Andre, Howardena Pindell, May Stevens, and Lucy Lippard who saw this incident as a key indicator of the systemic racism within the art world. Henry was also outspoken about the implicit racism of Women's Action Committee.

Exhibitions 
Henry's artwork has been exhibited in various shows and venues such as PPOW Gallery, the New Museum, the Studio Museum in Harlem, the Newark Museum, Artists Space, and Just Above Midtown.

Solo exhibitions and installations 
Lower Eastside Girls Club Community Gallery, "Two's", NYC, 2004
 Cedar Crest College, Recent Work, Curated by Cynthia Hawkins, Allentown, PA, 2003
 PPOW, "American Anatomy and Other Work", NYC, 2002
 John Jay College, "In Situ," NYC, 1998
 Hallwalls, "American Anatomy," Curated by Sara Kellner, Buffalo, NY, 1995
 Pulse Art, "American Anatomy," NYC, 1995
 Seventh Second Photo Gallery, "Social Commentary Sewn-up in Vinyl," Curated by Wendy Tiefenbacher, NYC, 1992
 Snug Harbor Cultural Center, Staten Island, NY, "Collecting, Organizing and Transposing," Curated by Olivia Georgia, NYC, 1990
 Public Art Fund, "Messages to the Public: Eventually," NY, 1988 
 Various Sites in Queens, "American Anatomy," NY, 1986
Studio Museum in Harlem, "From the Studio: Artists-in-Residence," NYC, 1983
 Just Above Midtown Gallery, "Janet Henry Retroactive," NYC, 1982
Basement Workshop, "Handel Was No Fool," NYC, 1981
 The Exhibitions Gallery, "Drawings and Other Things," Jamaica, NY 1978

Selected group exhibitions and installations 
Jamaica Center for Learning and Arts, "What Comes out of Our Textbooks," Queens, New York 2021
Queens Museum, "Queens International 2018: Volumes," Curated by Sophia Marisa Lucas and Baseera Khan, NYC, 2018
A.I.R. Gallery, "Dialectics of Entanglement: Do We Exist Together?" Curated by Roxana Fabius and Patricia M. Hernandez, NYC, 2018
York College Fine Arts Gallery, "Southeast Queens Biennial: A Locus of Moving Points," Curated by NLE Curatorial Lab, NYC, 2018
Brooklyn Museum, "We Wanted a Revolution," Curated by Catherine Morris, NYC, 2017
FiveMyles Gallery, "No Place Like Utopia," Curated by Matt Freedman, NYC, 2008
 City Without Walls, Corridor Gallery, "Close to the Edge," Curated by Reynolds and Kevin Sampson, Newark, NJ, NYC, 2008
 Bedford Hills Correctional Facility, "Inside/Out", Curated by Duston Spear, NY, 2008
 Indiana State University, "Contemporary Women Artists," Curated by Judy Collischan, Terre Haute, Indiana, 2005
 Light Work, Menschel Gallery, "Ties that Bind," Syracuse University, 2002
 Center for Photography at Woodstock, "We are Named," Curated by Susan Evans, NY, 2001
Exit Art, "Choices 99," Selected by Carrie Mae Weems, NYC, 1999
 Art Resources Transfer, NYC, 1999
 Giordano Gallery, "The Bead...," Cathy Valenza, Dowling College, Oakdale, NY, 1999
 Lemmerman Gallery, Jersey City University, "Picture/Image/Word," Mauro Altamura, 1998
 PPOW Gallery, "Rights of Spring," Curated by Carrie Mae Weems, NYC, 1998
 1612 Pine Street, "Summer Camping," Curated by Dean Daderko, Philadelphia, PA, 1998
 PS 122 Gallery, "Shake: An Exhibition of Snow Domes," Curated by Jane Harris, NYC, 1998
 Dorfman Projects, "Tip of the Iceberg," Art Resources Transfer, NYC, 1998
 Betty Rymer Gallery,  Art Institute of Chicago, "Sexting Myths: Representing Sexuality in African American Art," Curated by Kymberly Pinder, 1998
 Henry Street Settlement, "Stiches," Curated by Kathleen Spicer, NYC, 1997
 Kingsborough Community College Art Gallery, "Figuring Woman's Lives," Janice Farley, 1997
 Abington Art Center, "New American Portraits," Dean Daderko, Jenkintown, PA, 1996
The Drawing Center, "Cultural Economics: Histories from the Alternative Arts Movement," Curated by Julie Ault, NYC, 1996
 Algira Center of Contemporary Art, "With All Deliberate Speed: Revisiting Race and Education," Curated by Howard McCalebb and Carl Hazelwood, Newark, NJ, 1996
 Manhattan Borough President's Gallery, "Through Our Eyes - By Women About Women," Curated by Laura Litchfield, 1996
 Anderson Gallery, "X-Sightings," Buffalo, NY, 1996
New Museum, "Human/Nature," Benefit Exhibition, NYC, 1995
 494 Gallery, "Pride and Prejudice," Shari Diamond and Honor LaSSale, NYC, 1995
 The Gallery at Hunter College,  "Beyond Circumstance," Curated by Margeret McInroe, NYC, 1995
 42nd Street Development Project and Creative Time, NYC, 1994
 Puffin Room,  "Identity Crisis," Curated by Laurie Ourlicht and Kenny Schacter, NYC 1994
Art in General, "Little Things," Curated by Holly Block, NYC, 1994
 Momenta, "Yes I Am - No I'm Not," Curated by Laura Parness and Eric Heist, NYC 1994
New Museum, "Bad Girls," Curated by Marsha Tucket, NYC, 1994
Artists Space, "Artists Select," Selected by Lanie Lee, NYC, 1994
 Longwood Art Gallery, "Urban Masculinity," Curated by Bettie-Sue Hertz and Calvin Reid, Bronx, NY, 1993
 Real Art Ways, Hartford, CT, 1994
 AC Project Room at 303 Gallery, "Welcome Edition," Curated by Paul Bloodgood and Alissa Friedman, NYC, 1993
Artists Space, "Activated Walls," Curated by Carlos Solana, NYC 1993
 Momenta,  "The Art of Self Defense and Revenge," Laura Parness and Eric Heist, NYC 1993
Queens Museum at PaineWeber Gallery, Curated by Phyllis Billick, NYC, 1992
 494 Gallery, "Race and Culture," Curated by Suzanne Nicholas, NYC 1991
 Maryland Art Place, "Collecting, Organizing and Transposing," Olivia Georgia, Baltimore, MD
 Anderson Gallery, Richmond, VA, 1989
 Aljira Center for Contemporary Art, "Art from the African Diaspora: Survival," Curated by Lorenzo Pace, Newark, NJ, 1988
 Diverse Works, "Coast to Coast," Organized by Faith Ringgold and Clarissa Sligh, Houston, TX, 1988
 Intar Gallery, "In Her Own Image," Curated by Howardena Pindell, NYC, 1988
White Columns, "Resistance (Anti-Baudrillard)" Curated by Group Material, NYC, 1987
 Longwood Arts Project, "Toys Art Us," Curated by Fred Wilson, Bronx, NY, 1986–87
 The Clocktower, "Progressions: A Cultural Legacy," Curated by Vivian Browne, Emma Amos and Julia Hotten, NYC 1986
 Longwood Arts Project, "In the Tropics," Curated by Kellie Jones, Bronx, NY, 1986
 California State College, Stanislaus at Turlock, "Exchange of Resources: Expanding Powers," Curated by Rebecca Ballenger, 1983
 Just Above Midtown Gallery, "A Love Story," Curated by Kathleen Gonchorov, NYC, 1983
 School of Visual Arts, "Transmogrify, "Selected by Caren Rosenblatt, NYC, 1983
 Ohio State University Gallery, "All's Fair in Love and War in Feminist Art,"Curated by Lucy Lippard, Columbus OH, 1983
 University of South Florida, Tampa, "Henry, Hill, Payne," 1983
 Hamilton College, "The Regentrified Jungle," Curated by Joe Lewis, Clinton, NY, 1983
Franklin Furnace, "Allegory of an Artist's Career," with Sydney Blum, NYC, 1981
Studio Museum in Harlem, "En Route," Curated by Patricia Monan Bell, NYC, 1981
A.I.R. Gallery, "The Dialectics of Isolation," Kazuko, Ana Mendietta and Zarina, NYC, 1981
 626 Gallery, "Private Worlds," Curated by Joyce Kozloff, NYC 1981

Awards 
 Penny McCall Foundation, Award, NYC, 2001
 Art Matters Foundation, Artist's Fellowship, NYC, 1994
 Flushing Council on Culture and the Arts, Cash Prize, "Artists Choose Artists," 1994
 New York State Regional Initiative, "Artists Projects," 1994
 Public Art Fund, Spectra-Color Board Commission, "Messages to the Public," NYC, 1987
 New York State Council on the Arts, Visual Artists-sponsored Project, 1985
 PS1, Studio Recipient, Long Island City, NY, 1983
 Public Art Fund, Mural Commission, Jamaica, NY, 1975
 School of Visual Arts, Scholarship, NYC, 1964

Residencies 
 Light Work Visual Studies, One Month Residency, Syracuse, NY, 2000
Yaddo, Three Week Residency, Saratoga Springs, NY, 1998
Studio Museum in Harlem, Artist-in-Residence, NY, 1983

External links 
 https://janethenry.com/home.html
Janet Henry on the African American Visual Artists Database

References 

Year of birth missing (living people)
Living people
African-American women artists
Artists from New York City
School of Visual Arts alumni
Fashion Institute of Technology alumni
People from East Harlem
People from Jamaica, Queens
20th-century American artists
20th-century American women artists
21st-century American artists
21st-century American women artists
20th-century African-American women
20th-century African-American artists
21st-century African-American women
21st-century African-American artists